Willy Vekemans (born 28 April 1945) is a Belgian former professional racing cyclist. He won the Omloop Het Volk in 1967 and Gent–Wevelgem in 1969.

Major results
1967
 1st Omloop Het Volk
1968
 1st GP du canton d'Argovie
 1st Stage 4 Tour of Belgium
 2nd GP Stad Vilvoorde
 7th Omloop Het Volk
1969
 1st Gent–Wevelgem
 1st Ronde van Limburg
 1st Hoeilaart–Diest–Hoeilaart
 1st Stage 4 Tour of Belgium
 3rd Paris–Roubaix
 3rd Harelbeke–Antwerp–Harelbeke
 5th Amstel Gold Race
 9th GP du canton d'Argovie
1970
 1st Omloop van de Westhoek
 1st Stage 2 Tirreno–Adriatico
 4th Kuurne–Brussels–Kuurne
 9th Overall Tour of Belgium
 9th Omloop Het Volk

References

External links
 

1945 births
Living people
Belgian male cyclists
People from Putte
Cyclists from Antwerp